The R8 is a line of Rodalies de Catalunya's Barcelona commuter rail service, operated by Renfe Operadora. It runs hourly between Martorell and Granollers across the Vallès Occidental region, spanning  and eight stations. The R8 primarily uses the Castellbisbal–Mollet-Sant Fost railway, as well as the Sant Vicenç de Calders–Vilafranca del Penedès–Barcelona and Barcelona–Cerbère railways on its southern and northern ends, respectively. It is currently the only line of the Barcelona commuter rail service entirely bypassing Barcelona. The trains operating on the line are Civia electrical multiple units (EMU).

R8 trains started operating on  after a service restructuring affecting the Barcelona commuter rail service. The newly created R8 took over the former route of line R7 between Martorell and Cerdanyola Universitat stations, then continuing eastwards to Granollers Centre railway station, without entering Barcelona.

List of stations
The following table lists the name of each station served by line R8 in order from west to east; the station's service pattern offered by R8 trains; the transfers to other Rodalies de Catalunya lines, including both commuter and regional rail services; remarkable transfers to other transport systems; the municipality in which each station is located; and the fare zone each station belongs to according to the Autoritat del Transport Metropolità (ATM Àrea de Barcelona) fare-integrated public transport system and Rodalies de Catalunya's own fare zone system for Barcelona commuter rail service lines.

References

External links
 Rodalies de Catalunya official website
 Schedule for the R8 (PDF format)
 R8 Rodalies (rod8cat) on Twitter. Official Twitter account by Rodalies de Catalunya for the R8 with service status updates (tweets usually published only in Catalan)
 R8 (rodalia 8) on Twitter. Unofficial Twitter account by Rodalia.info monitoring real-time information about the R8 by its users.
 Information about the R8 at trenscat.cat 

8
Railway services introduced in 2011